The 2009–10 TFF Second League season is the ninth since its introduction as the third level of the Turkish football pyramid and the fifth consecutive season where the current format is being used. It began on 30 August 2009 with the first matches of the ranking groups and will end in late May 2010 with the last matches of the promotion playoffs.

Competition format 
The 2009–10 season started with 45 teams distributed over four "ranking groups". Each ranking group comprised eleven teams (with the exception of Group 3, which featured twelve teams) according to geographical criteria. The teams of each group played a conventional double round-robin schedule against the other teams of their group.

Upon conclusion of the ranking groups, the best two sides of each eleven-team group and the best three sides of the twelve-team group advanced to the "promotion group", while the remaining nine teams remained in their respective groups, which were now called "classification groups". The teams of the classification groups retained their complete records in the process. As in the previous round, each team played a double round-robin schedule against the other teams of its respective group.

A total of three promotion spots to the TFF First League were played out. Two of them were reserved for the best two teams of the promotion group, which were directly promoted. The third spot was decided through a play-off round and was competed among the teams ranked third through sixth of the promotion group and the winners of the four classification groups. The bottom three teams of the classification groups were directly relegated to the TFF Third League.

Teams

Ranking groups

Group 1

Group 2

Group table

Top goalscorers 
 Last updated on December 27, 2009

Group 3

Group 4

Promotion group

Group table

Results

Top goalscorers 
Including matches played on April 5, 2010

Classification groups

Classification group 1

Classification group 2

Classification group 3

Classification group 4

Promotion play-offs 
The teams placed third through sixth of the promotion group and the four winners of the classification groups competed in a single-elimination playoff for the last promotion spot.

Quarterfinals

Semifinals

Final

See also 
 2009–10 Süper Lig
 2009–10 TFF First League
 2009–10 Türkiye Kupası

References

External links 
 Official competition website

TFF Second League seasons
3
Turkey